Long Way Home is the eighth studio album by American heavy metal band Dokken, released in the spring of 2002. It is the only Dokken album which features Europe guitarist John Norum and the first featuring bassist Barry Sparks.

One of the songs on the album, "Heart Full of Soul", is a cover version of the 1965 single by the English rock band The Yardbirds. The song was written by Graham Gouldman of the band 10cc.

As of 2011, Long Way Home has sold 410,000 copies worldwide.

Alternate versions of the album cover featured a special lighting effect around the body of the model.

Track listing

Personnel

Dokken
 Don Dokken – lead and backing vocals, rhythm guitar, acoustic guitar, producer
 John Norum – lead guitar
 Barry Sparks – bass guitar, backing vocals
 Mick Brown – drums, backing vocals

Production
 Wyn Davis, Mike McMullen, Brian Daugherty, Mike Lesniak – engineers
 Michael Wagener – mixing at WireWorld Studios, Nashville, Tennessee
 Eric Conn – mastering

References

Dokken albums
2002 albums
Sanctuary Records albums
CMC International albums
Universal Music Japan albums